The Malvern Festival was first held in 1929 and ran annually until 1939. It was founded by Sir Barry Jackson who also founded Birmingham Repertory Theatre.

The Malvern Festival (in 1929) was devoted to modern plays, particularly those of its patron, George Bernard Shaw, and the Festival Company included two recent graduates from the Central School of Speech and Drama, Eve Turner and Yvette Pienne (Stage ‘28).

References

Theatre festivals in England
History of Worcestershire
Malvern, Worcestershire
Annual events in England
1929 establishments in England
1939 disestablishments in England